Otterup is a town in central Denmark, located in Nordfyn municipality on the island of Funen with a population of 5,269 (1 January 2022). Between 1889 and 1994 the Schultz & Larsen rifle factory was working from this small town.

Notable people 

 Martin Knudsen (born 1871 in Hasmark – 1945) Danish physicist and oceanographer
 Jørgen Møller (1873 in Otterup – 1944) a Danish chess master
 Rudolf Broby-Johansen (1900–1987) an art historian, communist activist and writer; grew up in Lunde, Otterup 
 Uffe Schultz Larsen (1921 in Otterup – 2005) a Danish sport shooter, competed in various events at the 1948, 1952, 1956 and 1960 Summer Olympics
 Leif Davidsen (born 1950 in Otterup) a Danish author and journalist
 Patrick Banggaard (born 1994 in Otterup) a Danish footballer who plays as a defender for SønderjyskE

References

External links
Otterup municipality & Otterup city

Cities and towns in the Region of Southern Denmark
Populated places in Funen
Nordfyn Municipality